Division No. 1, Subdivision Y is an unorganized subdivision on the Avalon Peninsula in Newfoundland and Labrador, Canada. It is in Division 1 on Trinity Bay.

According to the 2016 Statistics Canada Census:
Population: 1,118
% Change (2011 to 2016): -4.9
Dwellings: 857
Area: 190.87 km2
Density: 5.9 people/km2

Newfoundland and Labrador subdivisions